Kelowna is the largest city in the Okanagan Valley and the interior of British Columbia with a growing population of 143,000. Currently, the tallest building in the city is the 36 story One Water Street West Tower.

There are many more high rise developments underway in Kelowna, with Water Street by the Park being the next one underway.

Tallest buildings

This list ranks buildings in Kelowna that stand at least 30 metres (98.4 ft) tall, based on CTBUH height measurement standards. This includes spires and architectural details but does not include antenna masts.

Tallest under construction or proposed 

This is a list of current highrise developments currently under construction in the city of Kelowna.

Timeline of tallest buildings

This is a list of buildings that in the past held the title of tallest building in Kelowna:

 Kiwanis Tower (Residential) Height: 43 m (141 ft) Stories: 12 Year Built: 1976
 The Dolphins (Residential) Height: 56.1 m (184 ft) Stories: 17 Year Built: 1994
 Discovery Pointe Resort (Mixed use) Height: 70.1 m (230 ft) Stories: 22 Year Built: 2005
 Skye at Waterscapes (Residential) Height: 88 m (289 ft) Stories: 27 Year Built: 2010
 One Water Street West (Residential) Height: 123 m (404 ft) Stories: 36 Year Built: 2021 (the tallest building in BC outside Greater Vancouver)

See also

List of tallest buildings in Canada
List of tallest buildings in British Columbia
List of tallest buildings in Calgary

References

Lists of tallest buildings in Canada
T
Okanagan-related lists
Tallest buildings in Kelowna